is a near-Earth object of the Atira group.

Discovery
 was discovered at r=20.2 mag on 2020 July 19 by the Zwicky Transient Facility using the 1.2-m f/2.4 Schmidt.

Orbit and classification 

It orbits the Sun at a distance of 0.5–0.8 AU once every 6 months (186 days; semi-major axis of 0.64 AU). Its orbit has an eccentricity of 0.25 and a relatively high inclination of 33° with respect to the ecliptic.

The orbital evolution of  indicates that it is comfortably entrenched within the Atira orbital realm, but it might have arrived there relatively recently.

References

External links 
 
 

Minor planet object articles (unnumbered)
Discoveries by the Zwicky Transient Facility
20200719